Janur (from Javanese language ) is a young leaf of big palm tree, especially coconut, sugar palm (Arenga pinnata) and sago palm (Metroxylon rumphii or Metroxylon sagu). Janur is used as a tool by tribes in Indonesia as part of their daily lives. It is also called  yellow coconut leaf, the colour could be light green or whitish green. Janur, placed in the roadside at a single bamboo adorned with complicated plaits indicates that a wedding party is being held in the street where it is erected.

References

Palm trees in culture
Food storage containers
Javanese culture